Katabasis or catabasis (from  "down" and  "go") is a descent of some type, such as moving downhill, moving to a lower realm of existence, a military retreat, or a regression of some type.

 Katabasis, a trip to the underworld or the land of the dead
 A trip from the interior to the coast
 March to the Sea (disambiguation), one translation of this sense of the phrase
 Katabatic wind, cold winds that come from glacial mountains downward

See also
 Anabasis (ἀνάβασις), "going up" or "ascent" or a journey to the interior, the reverse of a katabasis in Greek